This is a list of the first minority male lawyer(s) and judge(s) in Alabama. It includes the year in which the men were admitted to practice law (in parentheses). Also included are other distinctions such as the first minority men in their state to graduate from law school or become a political figure.

Firsts in Alabama's history

Lawyers 

First African American male: Moses W. Moore (1871) 
First African American male from Alabama to practice before the U.S. Supreme Court: Samuel R. Lowery (1875) in 1880

State judges
 First African American male: Roderick B. Thomas in 1874 
 First African American male (circuit judge): Cain James Kennedy (1971) in 1979 
 First African American male (probate court): William McKinley Branch in 1970 
First African American male (Alabama Supreme Court): Oscar Adams (1947) in 1980 
First African American male (Seventeenth Judicial Circuit in Alabama): Eddie Hardaway, Jr. (1978) in 1995

Federal judges
First African American male (U.S. federal judge): U. W. Clemon (1968) in 1980 
First African American male (U.S. District Court for the Southern District of Alabama): Terry F. Moorer in 2018

Assistant Attorney General 

 First African American male: Myron Herbert Thompson in 1972

United States Attorney 

 First African American male: Kenyen R. Brown in 2009

Assistant United States Attorney 

 First African American male (Northern District of Alabama): J. Richmond Pearson in 1967

District Attorney 
 First African American male: Barrown Lankster in 1992
 First African American male (President of the Alabama District Attorney's Association): Michael W. Jackson in 2021

Alabama State Bar Association 

 First African American male (President): Fred Gray Sr. in 2002

Firsts in local history 

 Michael W. Jackson: First African American male to serve as the District Attorney for the Fourth Judicial Circuit in Alabama (2004) [Bibb, Dallas, Hale, Perry and Wilcox Counties, Alabama]
 Eddie Hardaway, Jr. (1978): First African American male to serve on the Seventeenth Judicial Circuit in Alabama (1995)
 Rufus C. Huffman, Sr.: First African American male probate judge in Bullock County, Alabama (1976)
 J.L. Chestnut (1958): First African American male lawyer in Selma, Dallas County, Alabama
 Orzell Billingsley and Peter Hall: First African American male lawyers to try a case in Dallas County, Alabama
 Jimmy Nunn: First African American male probate judge in Dallas County, Alabama (2018)
 William McKinley Branch: First African American male elected as a probate judge in Greene County, Alabama (1970)
 Theo Lawson II: First African American male to serve as the County Attorney of Jefferson County, Alabama (2016)
 Danny Carr: First African American male to serve as the District Attorney (Birmingham division) of Jefferson County, Alabama (2018)
 Oscar Adams (1947): First African-American male admitted to the Birmingham Bar Association [Jefferson and Shelby Counties, Alabama]
 J. Mason Davis: First African American male to serve as the President of the Birmingham Bar Association (1983) [Jefferson and Shelby Counties, Alabama]
 John Hulett: First African American male to serve as a probate judge in Lowndes County, Alabama
 Alfonza Menefee: First African American male probate judge in Macon County, Alabama (1988)
 Charles Swinger Conley: First African American male judge of the Court of Common Pleas (1972)
 Thomas H. Figures: First African American male to serve as the Assistant District Attorney for Mobile County, Alabama
 Steven Reed: First African American male to serve as a probate judge in Montgomery County, Alabama (2012)
 Michael Figures, Booker Forte, Jr., and Ronald E. Jackson: First African American males to graduate from the University of Alabama School of Law (1972)
 Eric Hamilton: First African American male to serve as an Assistant District Attorney for Walker County, Alabama (2013)

See also 

 List of first minority male lawyers and judges in the United States

Other topics of interest 

 List of first women lawyers and judges in the United States
 List of first women lawyers and judges in Alabama

References 

 
Minority, Alabama, first
Minority, Alabama, first
Alabama lawyers
law
Lists of people from Alabama